Home at Last is an episodic comedy web series created and written by Matt Giegerich and Chelsea Mize. The series is directed by Stephen Sprinkles and stars William Russ (Boy Meets World). It premiered on YouTube and other online distribution channels in the fall of 2011.

The show is about a homeless man, "Bob", that moves in with the son he abandoned at birth, "Mike." The story focuses on Bob's sloppy integration into the 'civilized' world, and his son's struggle to accept his Dad into his life for the first time in twenty five years.

Characters and cast
Mike  is the protagonist of the story.  He's 25, and he's pretty much the nicest sap in the world. He works as a dental hygienist by day, and volunteers at a homeless shelter by night. He has a real desire to help people. Mike's mother died when he was very young, and he hasn't seen his father since birth. The character of Mike is portrayed by Mike Bash. Bash is also a co-producer on the series.
Bob is a bum. Until the series begins, he lives on the streets. He moves in with Mike in the beginning of season one, under the pretense that he is Mike's dad. Bob is played by William Russ, a veteran television and film actor. Russ is also a co-producer on the series.
Pizza Boy is a pizza delivery boy. Pizza Boy is played by Jacob Grodnik.
Kim is Mike's roommate. They have a platonic relationship. She is very averse to Bob's arrival, but warms up to him over time. Kim is played by Lira Kellerman, actress and blogger at The Struggling Actress.
Handsome Man is a featured character in episode six, who claims to be Mike's real father. This character is played by Jeff Lewis (from The Guild and the 5 Minute Comedy Hour'').Peter''' is Mike's best friend. Peter is portrayed by Eric Rubin.

References

American comedy web series